David Brower Kurtz (1819 – March 23, 1898), aka Daniel Brower Kurtz, was an American Whig and Democratic politician from California.

Kurtz was born 1819 in Pennsylvania.  He came to San Diego in 1850 where he studied law.  He was admitted to the bar in 1856. He also was a contractor and constructed several buildings in Old Town San Diego and elsewhere.

Kurtz was the second mayor of San Diego under U.S. rule, from 1851 until 1852. He later was a member of the California State Senate in 1852 and 1855, as a Whig party member, county judge 1855–1856, member of the California State Assembly during 1861–1862 and 1865–1866, representing the 1st District.

During the Civil War Kurtz was a Breckinridge Democrat (Southern sympathizer).  Kurtz was appointed brigadier-general of the State Militia in 1856. Kurtz was president of the San Diego's Board of Trustees in 1862, when San Diego did not have a Mayoral form of government.

In 1866 he moved to San Luis Rey, California, in present Oceanside, California, and died there 1898. He's buried at Mount Hope Cemetery in San Diego.

Kurtz Street, located in the Midway District and Middletown neighborhoods of San Diego, is named for him. The Fire Mountain area of Oceanside also has a Kurtz Street.

References

 History of San Diego (1907), pp. 267-268 by William Ellsworth Smythe

 
 

Mayors of San Diego
1819 births
1898 deaths
Kurtz
California Whigs
19th-century American politicians
California Democrats
People from Oceanside, California
Members of the California State Assembly
California state senators